Le Roy, or more commonly LeRoy, is a town in Monroe County, New York or Genesee County, New York, United States. The population was 7,641 at the time of the 2010 census. The town is named after one of the original land owners, Herman Le Roy. The town lies on the southwestern edge of Monroe County. Within the town is a village of Le Roy.  The Jell-O gelatin dessert was invented and first manufactured in Le Roy.

History 
The area was first settled in 1793. The town of Le Roy was established in 1812 as the "Town of Bellona" from part of the town of Caledonia (Livingston County). The name was later changed to "Le Roy" in 1813, after New York City merchant and land speculator Herman LeRoy.

The Jell-O gelatin dessert was invented and first manufactured in Le Roy, and the Jell-O Museum is located in the town. General Foods closed the Jell-O factory in 1964 and relocated to Dover, Delaware.

Le Roy was the home of Calvin Keeney, who was the first breeder to successfully produce a stringless green bean.

Le Roy also has a 100-inch tall, 290 lb. replica of the Statue of Liberty located on Wolcott Street on the banks of Oatka creek.

Geography
According to the United States Census Bureau, the town has a total area of 42.2 square miles (109.2 km), all  land.

The east town line is the border of Monroe and Livingston counties.

Oatka Creek, a tributary of the Genesee River, flows northward through the town and was a source of water power for early mills. The New York State Thruway (Interstate 90) passes across the northern part of the town. The western terminus of Interstate 490 is also here.

The town rests atop the Onondaga Formation which forms an escarpment that faces north and runs east/west, just north of the village. The limestone rock is highly fossiliferous, of Devonian age, and extensively quarried. It is used for road building as crushed rock, and for the manufacture of portland cement. In the eastern part of the town is a community named Lime Rock.

Demographics

At the 2000 census there were 7,790 people, 3,037 households, and 2,034 families in the town. The population density was 184.7 people per square mile (71.3/km). There were 3,219 housing units at an average density of 76.3 per square mile (29.5/km). The racial makeup of the town was 96.01% White, 1.87% Black or African American, 0.27% Native American, 0.44% Asian, 0.01% Pacific Islander, 0.21% from other races, and 1.19% from two or more races. Hispanic or Latino people of any race were 0.78%.

Of the 3,037 households 31.9% had children under the age of 18 living with them, 52.3% were married couples living together, 9.8% had a female householder with no husband present, and 33.0% were non-families. 26.9% of households were one person and 11.3% were one person aged 65 or older. The average household size was 2.49 and the average family size was 3.04.

The age distribution was 25.2% under the age of 18, 6.9% from 18 to 24, 29.4% from 25 to 44, 23.5% from 45 to 64, and 15.1% 65 or older. The median age was 38 years. For every 100 females, there were 93.0 males. For every 100 females age 18 and over, there were 89.9 males.

The median household income was $39,690 and the median family income was $49,189. Males had a median income of $36,810 versus $23,024 for females. The per capita income for the town was $19,342. About 3.8% of families and 5.6% of the population were below the poverty line, including 5.0% of those under age 18 and 10.8% of those age 65 or over.

Communities and locations in the town of Le Roy 
Fort Hill – a hamlet in the northwest part of the town, north of Le Roy village on Route 19. It is the site of a prehistoric Native American village.
Le Roy – a village on Route 5 and Oatka Creek
Le Roy Airport (5G0) – a small general aviation airport east of the village on Route 5
Lime Rock – a hamlet on Route 5 near the eastern town line, east of Le Roy village

2011 illness outbreak 
Beginning in August 2011, 14 students (13 girls and one boy) from the LeRoy Junior-Senior High School began reporting perplexing medical symptoms including verbal outbursts, tics, seizure activity and speech difficulty. In mid-January, five days after a community meeting in which the New York State Department of Health stated their diagnosis could not be revealed publicly due to privacy concerns, two of the girls appeared on NBC's Today Show to discuss their frustration with not getting adequate answers. 

The next day, Laszlo Mechtler, a neurologist treating most of the girls, was given permission to share the diagnosis of conversion disorder and mass psychogenic illness. Unsatisfied with the investigation's results, the girls and their parents spoke out publicly against their diagnosis, stating they believed the situation warranted further scrutiny from outside sources. Alternative medical theories were suggested, including Tourette syndrome and PANDAS, which Mechtler and his team ruled out. Erin Brockovich, noted environmental activist, was called to town to investigate environmental pollution from the 1970 Lehigh Valley Railroad derailment as a possible cause. During this time, many of the girls appeared in the local and national media, as well as posting on social media. As this happened, the illness spread to 20 individuals. Eventually, as doctors encouraged their patients to stay away from the media and the media attention died down, many of the girls' symptoms improved. By the end of the school year in June, one girl was diagnosed with Tourette syndrome, and most of the girls who received treatment for conversion disorder were healthy in time for graduation. No environmental causes were found after repeated testing around the school and surrounding areas of town.  

Bartholomew, Wessely and Rubin questioned in 2012 whether interaction on social media (Facebook, Twitter, YouTube and Internet blogs) contributed to mass psychogenic illness when the adolescent girls reported tic-like movements. Bartholomew et al reported twitching epidemics in the US as early as 1939, and wrote that the Leroy outbreak was the "third recorded school outbreak of conversion disorder with motor disturbances to occur in the USA since 2002", but the first in which reports of affected individuals spread via social networks.

Notable people

 Seth M. Gates, former U.S. congressman from New York
 Ruth Webster Lathrop, physician, medical college professor in Philadelphia
 Erin K. O'Shea, President of the Howard Hughes Medical Institute (HHMI) and Professor of Molecular and Cellular Biology and Chemistry and Chemical Biology at Harvard University
 Pearle Bixby Waite, native Le Roy man who invented the modern recipe for JELL-O. His wife is noted for coining the name.  Jell-O 1-2-3.

See also
Marion Steam Shovel (Le Roy, New York)

References

External links
 
 Town website
  Early history of Le Roy, NY
 Le Roy Town, Genesee County, New York Genweb Project

 
Towns in Genesee County, New York
Onondaga limestone